This is the discography for the rock band The Wildhearts.

Albums

Studio albums

Live albums
Anarchic Airwaves (1998) 
Tokyo Suits Me (1999) #80 JP  
The Wildhearts Strike Back (2004) #166 JP
Geordie in Wonderland (2006) 
Live in the Studio (2007)
Rock City vs The Wildhearts (2014)
Never Outdrunk, Never Outsung – PHUQ Live (2016)
30 Year Itch (2020)

Compilations
The Best of The Wildhearts (1996) #48 JP
Landmines & Pantomimes (1998)
Anthem: The Single Tracks (1998)
Moodswings and Roundabouts (1998)
Riff After Riff After Motherfucking Riff (2002) #63 JP
Riff After Riff (2003)
Coupled With (2004)
The Works (2008)

EPs
Mondo Akimbo a-Go-Go (1992)
Don't Be Happy... Just Worry (1992)
¡Chutzpah! Jnr. (2009) #209 JP
Diagnosis (2019)

Singles

Bootlegs
The band have always had a permissive attitude to fans making bootleg recordings of their live shows, as long as nobody tries to profit financially from them. There are therefore many unofficial live recordings which are traded amongst fans.

There are also a number of bootlegs of various studio recordings.
Angel Biscuits is a series of bootleg CD-R's containing MP3 files of rare material from The Wildhearts. These unofficial bootlegs were sold at cost price by a fan of the band, with the blessing of Ginger and the band.
Shitty Fuckin' Stupid Tracks was a bootleg recording mainly distributed in cassette format containing a collection of unreleased, unfinished studio tracks recorded in 1996. This material was later included on the compilation Landmines and Pantomimes, against the wishes of the band.

Other releases

In 2002 the Jason Ringenberg album All Over Creation featured a song co-written by Ginger and Jason called "One Less Heartache." This was recorded in 2001 with the Wildhearts lineup of Ginger, CJ, Danny and Stidi acting as Jason's backing band.  A second song, a cover of "Jimmy Rodgers Last Blue Yodel," recorded at the same time, was released later on the Jason Ringenburg collection Best Tracks and Side Tricks 1979-2007.

The band of the same lineup has also recorded a version of "Wild Zero" by Japanese band Guitar Wolf which appears on I Love Guitar Wolf Very Much – a tribute to Guitar Wolf.

The band also covered "Pump It Up" by Elvis Costello. This was included on the rock compilation album Corrosion in 2000.

As of August 2009, the band have released two exclusive tracks on their website for free download.  The first, "Borderline," was released around Christmas 2008 as a present from the band.  The second, "The Snake, The Lion, The Monkey and The Spider" was released on 15 August 2009, as a teaser for the new album ¡Chutzpah!. The track has since appeared on the EP ¡Chutzpah! Jnr..

References

External links
Wildhearts Discography on The Wildhearts Official Site

Discographies of British artists
Rock music group discographies